Rugby union in New Caledonia is a minor but growing sport.

Governing body

The Comité Régional de Rugby de Nouvelle Calédonie is a committee under the umbrella of the French Rugby Federation which is the governing body for rugby union within New Caledonia.

The committee is not affiliated to the IRB in its own right, but it is a full member of the Federation of Oceania Rugby Unions (FORU), which is the governing body for rugby in Oceania.

History
Rugby union was first introduced into New Caledonia by the French, and has been played there for at least a century. New Caledonia is still a French colony, and this has proven a mixed blessing, as players have the prospect of "promotion" to French professionalism/semi-amateurism, but this also potentially weakens the New Caledonian system, removing players, and disallowing them to represent their own country.

Rugby Sevens has been a sport in the South Pacific Games since the late 1990s.

There is also a semi-formal league structure.

New Caledonia took part in a rugby sevens tournament in the Cook Islands in June, 2009.

See also 
 New Caledonia national rugby union team
 New Caledonia national rugby union team (sevens)
 New Caledonia women's national rugby union team (sevens)
 Rugby union in France

References

 Cotton, Fran (Ed.) (1984) The Book of Rugby Disasters & Bizarre Records. Compiled by Chris Rhys. London. Century Publishing.

External links
 Federation of Oceania Rugby Unions, New Caledonia page
 New Caledonia scenes and its rugby team
 The Fiji Women’s U-19 rugby team tours New Caledonia.
 Wallisian rugby player in New Caledonia murder trial
 Oceania Nations, New Caledonia
 Colonial Rugby ! Noumea, New Caledonia c.1905
 Two days of rugby union sevens
 Archives du Rugby: Nouvelle Caledonie

 
Sport in New Caledonia